Meglena Shtilianova Kuneva (born 22 June 1957) is a Bulgarian and EU politician.

Biography 

Born in Sofia, Kuneva is descended from a Catholic family from the town of Rakovski. She graduated in Law from Sofia University in 1981, and in 1984 she became a Doctor of Law. She worked as a journalist for the Law Programme of the Bulgarian National Radio while being an Assistant Professor at Sofia University. In 1990 she took a job as Senior Legal Advisor at the Council of Ministers and held it until 2001. In the meantime Kuneva specialized in Foreign Affairs and Environmental Law at Georgetown University and the University of Oxford.

In June 2001 she was elected a deputy (Member of Bulgarian Parliament) as a founding member of the Liberal Simeon II National Movement (NDSV) party. In August 2001 Kuneva left her position in the Bulgarian parliament because she was appointed Deputy Minister of Foreign Affairs and Chief Negotiator of the Republic of Bulgaria with the European Union. She represented the Bulgarian Government in the Convention on the Future of Europe (the European Convention), which designed the EU Constitutional Treaty (the European Constitution).

In May 2002 she was appointed Bulgaria's first Minister of European Affairs in the government of former Tsar Simeon Sakskoburggotski. She held that job even after the 2005 parliamentary elections, when NDSV became a junior partner in the Bulgarian Socialist Party-dominated coalition government of Sergey Stanishev – the only minister of the former cabinet to retain her post.

On 26 October 2006 Kuneva was nominated to be Bulgaria's first member of the European Commission. European Commission President Jose Manuel Durao Barroso assigned her the portfolio of Consumer Protection. Kuneva was decisively approved by the European Parliament on 12 December 2006 with 583 votes "in favour", 21 votes "against" and 28 votes "abstentions". She commenced her mandate as EU Commissioner on 1 January 2007, when Bulgaria officially joined the EU. On 22 January 2007 Meglena Kuneva took an Oath as a European Commissioner at the European Court in Luxembourg. One of her first acts as a European Commissioner was to criticize the iPod and its effects on the youth in Bulgaria.

During her term in office, Kuneva was interested in online data collection (of personal data), profiling and behavioral targeting, and in particular is looking for "enforcing existing regulation on the Internet and to regulate where adequate response to consumer concerns on the issue of data collection".

Other activities
 European Council on Foreign Relations (ECFR), Member
 Vick Foundation, Member of the Jury for the 2008 Bulgarian Novel of the Year

Political positions
In October 2013, Kuneva announced her opposition to the ban on land sale to foreigners that was voted by the Bulgarian Parliament. This closely matches the stand the European Commission has taken on the matter.

In December 2013 she said that "she felt more pity than anger toward" Plamen Oresharski because he is not the real decision maker in the Council of Ministers.

Personal life
Meglena Kuneva is married to financier Andrey Pramov, a son of the secretary of the Central Committee of the Bulgarian Communist Party (1962–1978), and they have one son – Aleksandar. In addition to her native Bulgarian, she is fluent in English, French, and Russian. Kuneva's hobby is listening to classical music.

See also 
 Barroso Commission
 Bulgarian membership of the European Union

References

Bibliography

External links 
 
 Consumer Affairs

|-

1957 births
Bulgarian European Commissioners
Consumer rights activists
Government ministers of Bulgaria
Living people
Members of the National Assembly (Bulgaria)
Politicians from Sofia
Sofia University alumni
Alumni of the University of Oxford
Women European Commissioners
Women government ministers of Bulgaria
21st-century Bulgarian women politicians
21st-century Bulgarian politicians